Lady Evelyn-Smoothwater Provincial Park is a remote wilderness park in northeastern Ontario, Canada, north of Lake Temagami. It is one of five provincial parks located in the Temagami area.

This park encompasses Smoothwater Lake, Makobe Lake, the Ishpatina Ridge (highest point in Ontario), Maple Mountain (highest vertical rise in Ontario), and most of the Lady Evelyn River. The park also includes many waterfalls, such as Helen Falls, the highest waterfall on the Lady Evelyn River.  

Lady Evelyn-Smoothwater lies within the Eastern forest-boreal transition ecoregion. It offers protection to some of the last remaining stands of old growth forest in Ontario, and is home to the endangered Aurora trout. 

As a wilderness park, few services are offered to visitors but it is ideal for backcountry canoeing, nature exploration, and wildlife viewing. The park hosts fire towers on top of Ishpatina Ridge and Maple Mountain, accessible by hiking trails. Many of these portages are traditional indigenous routes called "nastawgan", which link this park with adjacent parks, conservation reserves, and Crown land.

The park is at the heart of a network of provincial parks and conservation reserves in the Temagami area. It borders on the Makobe-Grays River Provincial Park to the north, Sturgeon River Provincial Park to the southwest, Solace Provincial Park to the south, and Obabika River Provincial Park to the south and east. Furthermore, Smith Lake (to the west), North Yorston (to the south), and Jim Edwards Lake (to the south) Conservation Reserves are adjacent to Lady Evelyn-Smoothwater, while another 5 conservation reserves are within a few kilometres from the park.

History 
Lady Evelyn River was established as a park in 1973. In 1983, the park was expanded to its present area of 72,000 hectares.

The region has been home to the Teme-Augama Anishnabai for thousands of years; within the park, Maple Mountain (Chee-bay-jing) is traditional sacred site.

Throughout the park are remnants of logging activities from the early and mid-1900s.

See also
List of Ontario parks

References

External links

Friends of Temagami

Provincial parks of Ontario
Parks in Timiskaming District
Protected areas established in 1983
1983 establishments in Ontario
Geography of Temagami